Bang Ban is a district (amphoe) of Ayutthaya province, in central Thailand.

History
The district was originally created in 1894 as Sena Nai District, with its district office in Sai Noi Sub-district. Later Mr Khiao Bangban (นายเขียว บางบาล) donated a piece of land for the building of the new district office in Bang Ban Sub-district. So the government agreed to change the district name to the donor's family name, which became effective in 1917.

Geography
Neighbouring districts are (from the north clockwise) Pa Mok of Ang Thong province,  Bang Pahan, Phra Nakhon Si Ayutthaya, Bang Sai, Sena and Phak Hai of Ayutthaya Province.

Administration

Central administration 
The district Bang Ban is divided into 16 sub-districts (tambon), which are further subdivided into 111 administrative villages (Muban).

Local administration 
There are two sub-district municipalities (thesaban tambon) in the district:
 Bang Ban consisting of the sub-districts Bang Ban, Sai Noi, Bang Luang Dot, Bang Hak, Bang Chani, Ban Kum.
 Maha Phram consisting of the sub-districts Wat Yom, Saphan Thai, Maha Phram.

There are four sub-district administrative organizations (SAO) in the district:
 Kop Chao consisting of the sub-district Kop Chao.
 Ban Khlang consisting of the sub-district Ban Khlang.
 Phra Khao consisting of the sub-district Phra Khao.
 Nam Tao consisting of the sub-districts Nam Tao, Thang Chang, Wat Taku, Bang Luang.

References

External links
amphoe.com on Bang Ban

Bang Ban